Euphoria fascifera is a species of scarab beetle in the family Scarabaeidae.

Subspecies
These two subspecies belong to the species Euphoria fascifera:
 Euphoria fascifera fascifera (LeConte, 1861)
 Euphoria fascifera trapezium Casey, 1915

References

Further reading

 

Cetoniinae
Articles created by Qbugbot
Beetles described in 1861